6,6-Difluoronorethisterone acetate, also known as 6,6-difluoro-17α-ethynyl-19-nortestosterone 17β-acetate or as 6,6-difluoro-17α-ethynylestr-4-en-17β-ol-3-one 17β-acetate, is a steroidal progestin of the 19-nortestosterone group which was never marketed. In comparison to other steroids, is the C17β acetate ester of 6,6-difluoronorethisterone and the 6,6-difluoro analog of norethisterone acetate.

See also
 List of progestogen esters

References

Abandoned drugs
Acetate esters
Ethynyl compounds
Estranes
Enones
Organofluorides
Progestogen esters
Progestogens